Carlos Alberto Gomes Montero (born 25 June 1954) known as Pintinho, is a retired Brazilian footballer who played as a midfielder.

External links
 
 

1954 births
Living people
Brazilian footballers
Association football midfielders
Fluminense FC players
CR Vasco da Gama players
Sevilla FC players
Cádiz CF players
S.C. Farense players
Footballers from Rio de Janeiro (city)
Brazil international footballers